Daniela Laura Herrero (born August 19, 1985) is an Argentine Pop rock singer, songwriter and actress. She opened for Avril Lavigne on her Argentine segment of the Bonez Tour (2005).

Discography 
 Daniela Herrero (2001)
 No Voy A Mentirte (2003)
 El Espejo (2005)
 Altavoz (2010)
 Madre (2012)
 En Un Segundo (2015)

Videos 
 "Solo tus canciones"
 "Demasiado"
 "Cada vez"
 "Fuera de mi tiempo"
 "Como algo más" 
 "Adoquines"
 "Sé"
 "Silencio"
 "Juntos a la par"
 "Hacerte bien"
 "En un segundo"
 "Las estrellas"

Awards
 2002, Nominee, Los Premios MTV Latinoamérica for Best New Artist — South
 2004, Premios Carlos Gardel award for Best Female Album

See also
 List of Latin pop artists

References

External links
 Official website 
 

1985 births
People from Buenos Aires Province
21st-century Argentine women singers
Argentine women singer-songwriters
Pop rock singers
Living people